Denzil is a Cornish given name. It may refer to:

People
Denzil Batchelor, British journalist and writer
Denzil Best, American jazz percussionist
Denzil Botus, Trinidadian pannist
Denzil Davies, British politician
Denzil Dean Harber, British Trotskyist leader
Denzil Dennis, Jamaican reggae singer
Denzil Dolley, South African field hockey player
Denzil Douglas, former Prime Minister of Saint Kitts and Nevis
Denzil Dowell, police shooting victim
Denzil Doyle, Canadian entrepreneur
Denzil Fernando (1923-2010), Sri Lankan Sinhala lawyer and politician
Denzil Forrester, Grenada artist
Denzil Fortescue, 6th Earl Fortescue, British lieutenant colonel
Denzil Foster, one half of the American R&B duo Foster & McElroy
Denzil Franco, Indian footballer
Denzil Freeth, British politician
Denzil Hale, English footballer
Denzil Haroun, Manchester United Football Club club director
Denzil Hoaseb, Namibian footballer
Denzil Ibbetson, English administrator of British India 
Denzil Jones, Welsh rugby player
Denzil Keelor, Indian Air Force marshal
Denzil Kobbekaduwa, Sri Lankan general
Denzil Lacey, Irish radio presenter and DJ
Denzil Meuli, New Zealand editor
Denzil Meyrick, Scottish novelist
Denzil Minnan-Wong, Toronto city councilor
Denzil Owen, West Indian cricketer
Denzil Peiris (1917-1985), Sri Lankan Sinhala journalist
Denzil Price Marshall Jr., United States District Judge
Denzil Ralph Evans, English association footballer
Denzil Romero, Venezuelan writer
Denzil Sequeira, Botswana cricketer
Denzil Smith, Indian actor and producer
Denzil Thompson, Guyana football team manager
Denzil Webster, English cricketer
Denzil Williams, Welsh rugby player

Fictional characters
Denzil Calburn, from Emmerdale
Denzil Kelly, from Waterloo Road
Denzil Tulser, from Only Fools and Horses

Other uses
Denzil (band), English rock band
Denzil, Saskatchewan
Denzil Quarrier, 1892 novel by George Gissing

See also
All pages with titles beginning with Denzil
Denzel (disambiguation)
Denzil Holles (disambiguation)
Denzil Onslow (disambiguation)

English masculine given names